Act One most often refers to the first act of a play, opera, or other dramatic performance.

Act One, Act I, ACTI and similar may also refer to:

Theatre, film and books
 Act One (book), a 1959 memoir by Moss Hart
 Act One (film), a 1963 film version of the memoir
 Act One (play), a 2014 theatrical adaptation of the memoir by James Lapine
 Act One, Inc., an organization for aspiring filmmakers

Music
 "Act I: Eternal Sunshine (The Pledge)", a 2007 composition by Jay Electronica
 Act I and II, a 1993 concert tour by Prince
 Act One (album), a 1970 album by Beggars Opera
 Act One, an album by Marian Hill
 Act One, a 2006 EP by I Hate Kate
 Act I (Seldom Scene album), a 1972 album by the Seldom Scene
 Act I: Live in Rosario, a 2012 live album by Tarja Turunen
 Act I: The Lake South, the River North a 2006 album by the Dear Hunter
 Act I: Renaissance, or simply Renaissance, a 2022 album by Beyoncé

See also
 Acton Trussell (UK), formerly, Actone (England)
 ACTI (Automated Computer Telephone Interviewing)